Dholia also spelled Dholiya refers to an Indian gotra who do not cremate their dead.

References 

Rajput clans
Indian surnames
Social groups of Rajasthan